"Used to Be" is a song by American DJ and producer Steve Aoki and American singer-songwriter Kiiara, featuring American rapper Wiz Khalifa. The song was released on March 19, 2021 via Big Beat.

Composition
"Used to Be" contains a sample from Matchbox Twenty's single "Unwell" (2003), and reimagine.

Music video
The music video was directed by Noah Sterling and animated by Dreambear. Aoki, Kiiara and Khalifa fighting with an evil villain to save their "galactic city".

Credits and personnel
Credits adapted from Tidal.

 Michael McEachern – producer, writer
 Steve Aoki – producer, programmer, writer
 Wiz Khalifa – featured artist, programmer, writer
 Colin Leonard – Masterer
 Miles Walker – Mixer
 Bolooki – vocal producer
 Kiiara – vocal
 Alexander Pall – writer
 Andrew Taggart – writer
 Joseph Henderson – writer
 Madison Yanofsky – writer
 Michael V. Gazzo – writer
 Rob Thomas – writer

Charts

Weekly charts

Year-end charts

Release history

References

2021 songs
2021 singles
Steve Aoki songs
Kiiara songs
Wiz Khalifa songs
Songs written by Steve Aoki
Songs written by Wiz Khalifa
Songs written by Andrew Taggart
Songs written by Rob Thomas (musician)
Warner Music Group singles